Aleppo College (also called Aleppo American College) is a junior college. It awards high school degrees at the tenth grade. And up to 1964, it awarded freshman and sophomore classes in arts, engineering and medicine at the 11th and 12th Grades. It is based in the Syrian city of Aleppo since 1923. The roots of the college are traced back to the Central Turkey College of Aintab founded between 1874-1876 by the American Board of Commissioners and Foreign Missions in the Ottoman Empire to serve the large number of Christian Armenian population in the region.

History
The students of the Aintab College were largely Armenians -mainly Protestant Armenians-, but non-Armenians also attended. As a result of the massacres of the Armenians during the 1915 Armenian genocide, the college was transferred to the Syrian city of Aleppo, through the efforts of its director John E. Merrill (1898–1937), where it became known as Aleppo College or the Aleppo American College and functioned as a high school.

School facilities
By 1930, with the efforts of the American benefactor James Lack, a large piece of land of 13 hectares was donated to erect the new buildings of the school in the south-western suburbs of Aleppo. However, the construction process was launched in 1936 and completed in 1939. Due to the circumstances of the World War II, the construction of the second building (Girls High school) named American High School for Girls started only in 1950 and completed in 1952.

Legacy
In its life of more than 150 years the college has helped prepare thousands of young men and women for service to society. In the secular field its graduates have distinguished themselves as teachers, school administrators, nurses, physicians, surgeons, pharmacists, dentists, writers, merchants, engineers, government officials and a cross-section of the occupations of its alumni.

Alumni
Alumni of Aleppo College include: 
Nazim al-Kudsi, former president of Syria
Fateh Moudarres, renowned Syrian painter
Moustapha Akkad, film producer and director

References

1876 establishments in the Ottoman Empire
Schools in Syria
Education in Aleppo